Zincochromite is a zinc chromium oxide mineral with the formula ZnCr2O4.  It is the zinc analogue of chromite, hence the name.  It was first described in 1987 as an occurrence in a uranium deposit near Lake Onega, Russia. It has also been reported from Dolo Hill, New South Wales, Australia, and from the Tarkwa Mine in the Ashanti gold belt of Ghana.

References

Zinc minerals
Chromium minerals
Spinel group
Cubic minerals
Minerals in space group 227